The 2017–18 All-Ireland Junior Club Football Championship was the 17th staging of the All-Ireland Junior Club Football Championship since its establishment by the Gaelic Athletic Association.

The All-Ireland final was played on 3 February 2018 at Croke Park in Dublin, between Knocknagree and Multyfarnham. Knocknagree won the match by 3-13 to 3-09 to claim their first ever championship title.

All-Ireland Junior Club Football Championship

All-Ireland quarter-final

All-Ireland semi-finals

All-Ireland final

References

2017 in Irish sport
2018 in Irish sport
All-Ireland Junior Club Football Championship
All-Ireland Junior Club Football Championship